Anton Schwarzkopf (8 July 1924 – 30 July 2001) was a German engineer who founded Schwarzkopf Industries GmbH, a German manufacturer of roller coasters and other amusement rides that were sold to amusement parks and travelling funfairs around the world.

Early years
Anton Schwarzkopf, born  in Bahlingen, Germany, began as an apprentice in his father's business, which focused on the design of specialised trailers used to transport circus equipment.  By 1954, his father's company had transitioned into creating amusement rides.

Career
In 1957, Schwarzkopf built his first attraction, the Düsenspirale, which was a roller coaster that traveled around Germany with funfair showman Löffelhardt. He took over his father's company in 1960 and created his first full-scale steel roller coaster, The Wildcat, in 1964. In 1970, the first Jet Star II model was built for German showman Rick. The model became popular for its electric spiral lift hill, and many of this type were built. In 1976, Schwarzkopf partnered with ride engineer Werner Stengel to create a ground-breaking attraction, the Revolution roller coaster at Six Flags Magic Mountain in California. It was the first roller coaster in the modern era to feature a vertical loop. The vertical loop became a signature element used in many of Schwarzkopf's designs, including King Kobra at Kings Dominion in 1977, one of the first Shuttle Loop designs, and Shock Wave at Six Flags Over Texas in 1978, which featured consecutive vertical loops.

Schwarzkopf Industries GmbH experienced rapid growth throughout the 1970s, as its rides were well received and in high demand. In the 1980s, the company produced several transportable rides for travelling funfairs, particularly those in Western Europe, with a notable example being the Alpina Bahn in 1983. Dreier Looping (meaning triple loop in English) was built in 1984, and Thriller was built in 1986. Outside of Germany, the company partnered with Intamin, and many older rides credited to Intamin were actually designed and created by Schwarzkopf.  Schwarzkopf suffered several business setbacks and suffered through several bankruptcies, with the first occurring in late 1983, leading to the abandonment of several upcoming designs and installations. While dormant during the mid-1980s, Peißenberg and Zierer stepped in to construct several of Schwarzkopf's designs, including Bavarian Mountain Railroad in 1987.

The company continued to produce flat rides and assist with roller coaster design for a number of years, and some popular releases during this time included the Bayern Kurve, the Enterprise, and the Monster. Schwarzkopf retired from the industry in 1995 and died on  after battling Parkinson's disease for several years.

Legacy
There are a number of notable people from the amusement industry who have either worked with, or have relations to Anton Schwarzkopf. His brother, Franz Schwarzkopf, was also a ride designer around the same time as Anton, and designed many staples of the both amusement parks and carnivals alike, such as the Wave Swinger. Anton's son Wieland Schwarzkopf also became involved with the industry, starting out at Schwarzkopf, and later starting his own business in 1984. Wieland's company mostly provided parts and services for his father's rides, but had a few of its own attractions, such as the 'Sound Factory', a short-lived version of the popular 'Monster' ride with looping cars. Werner Stengel got his start with the Schwarzkopf company, and later went on to become one of the most prestigious designers of roller coasters and amusement rides. He was still heavily involved with most of Schwarzkopf's attractions. Hubert Gerstlauer, founder and namesake of Gerstlauer Amuesment Rides GmbH, was an employee of Schwarzkopf, before starting his own company in 1982. Gerstlauer's manufacturing is still carried out at the former Schwarzkopf facility in Münsterhausen, Bavaria.

Despite their age and shrinking numbers, Schwarzkopf rides remain popular. Revolution at Six Flags Magic Mountain and Whizzer at Six Flags Great America both received the American Coaster Enthusiasts (ACE) Coaster Landmark award signifying their importance to the industry.

List of notable roller coasters

As of 2019, Schwarzkopf has built 149 roller coasters around the world.

List of other attractions

Giant wheel – a  diameter ferris wheel at Six Flags Great Adventure and Cedar Point.
Orbit (Enterprise) – Six Flags Great America, formerly the Orleans Orbit upon opening of Marriott's Great America, operated from 1976 to 2016.
Orbit (Enterprise) – California's Great America. 
Wheelie (Enterprise) – Six Flags Over Georgia, operated from 1977 to 2012, removed to make room for SkyScreamer.   Now at Funspot in Orlando.
Enterprise – Attractiepark Slagharren.
Bayern Kurve – Kennywood.
Berserker (Bayern Kurve) – California's Great America.
Centrifuge (Calypso III) – California's Great America.
Fiddler's Fling (Calypso III) – Six Flags Great America.
The Lobster (Monster III) – Six Flags Great America. 
A Shuttle Boat ride (Santa Maria) at Bobbejaanland, defunct.
Apollo (Apollo 14) – Attractiepark Slagharren, one of two originally built at the park, both were converted to swing rides at some point, and one of the sides ended up at Loudoun Castle.
Octopus (Monster II) – Attractiepark Slagharren.
Sky Tower (Zepplin II) – Attractiepark Slagharren, later converted into an observation tower.
Monorail – Attractiepark Slagharren.
Riesenrad (Ferris Wheel 50m) – famous Oktoberfest ferris wheel, owned by showman Willenborg.

References

External links

Schwarzkopf Coaster Net — independent website
List of Schwarzkopf-designed roller coasters — at the Roller Coaster DataBase

1924 births
2001 deaths
German mechanical engineers
Engineers from Baden-Württemberg
People from Emmendingen (district)
Roller coaster designers
Roller coaster manufacturers
Amusement ride manufacturers
Neurological disease deaths in Germany
Deaths from Parkinson's disease